Khandauli is a census town in Agra district of Uttar Pradesh in India.

References

Cities and towns in Agra district